Senator Brush may refer to:

George W. Brush (1842–1927), New York State Senate
Henry Brush (1778–1855), Ohio State Senate
Joey Brush (1955–2015), Georgia State Senate